William S. Townsend House is located in the Dennisville section of Dennis Township, Cape May County, New Jersey, United States. The house was built in 1811 and added to the National Register of Historic Places on April 5, 1984.

According to the National Register Application:  "The house was the home of William S. Townsend, a prominent merchant, farmer, and community leader in Dennisville.  Architecturally, the house is an interesting example of the Vernacular Neoclassicial style.  The house is part of a well-preserved complex, which includes several outbuildings."

Copies of the U.S. Department of Interior, National Park Service Architectural Data Form and photographs of the building's interior and exterior are included in the Library of Congress's Prints & Photographs Reading Room - Prints & Photographs Online Catalog.

See also
National Register of Historic Places listings in Cape May County, New Jersey
 Library of Congress - Prints & Photographs Reading Room - Prints & Photographs Online Catalog https://www.loc.gov/pictures/item/NJ0040/

References

Dennis Township, New Jersey
Houses on the National Register of Historic Places in New Jersey
Houses completed in 1811
Houses in Cape May County, New Jersey
National Register of Historic Places in Cape May County, New Jersey
New Jersey Register of Historic Places